Crown Prince Jeongseong (died 1394) or known before as Prince Jeongseong, was the only son of King Gongyang and Consort Sun who would eventually become the last Crown Prince of the Goryeo dynasty. After Yi Seonggye established the new dynasty, he was deposed from his throne along with his parent and got assassinated. His birth name was Wang Dan, but later changed to Wang Seok whom he better known with it.

Biography

Early life
Born as Wang Dan (왕단, 王瑞), he was the only son of Wang Yo, Prince Jeongchang and Lady No. Then, he changed his name into "Seok" (석, 奭) and given royal title as Prince Jeongseong (정성군, 定城君) in 1388. Although his birth date was not clear, but it seems that he was born before 1388 since in that year he already held a royal title. One year later, following his father who ascended the throne under General Yi Seong-gye's command after deposed King Chang, Jeongseong then became the Crown Prince (왕세자, 王世子).

Palace life and marriage
In 1390, Seoyeon was opened, a "Sabu" (사부, 師傅) and a "Sihak" (시학, 侍學) were appointed and received Confucian education, there were also Jo Jun (조준) and Yi Seo (이서). The Crown Prince was said to engrossed in Buddhism and on 4 February 1391, he went to "Hoeam Temple" (회암사), where he and his parents prayed all night long. In the next day, Seok offered 1,200 linens (1,200필) to the monks.

On 20 February 1391, there was held the Selection of the Crown Princess Consort (세자빈 간택) and the chosen one was Yi Won-goeng (이원굉)'s daughter from the Incheon Yi clan (인천 이씨). Not long after that, the King gave her a dignitary as her gifts and the white crown bows. Lady Yi then became the Crown Princess Consort (왕세자빈, 王世子嬪) not long after their marriage in the same year.

Meanwhile, after a year since the King decided to move the capital to Hanyang, but changed to Gaegyeong after decided again. Wang Seok then visited "Yangneung" (양릉, 陽陵) and made a sacrifice in Hyosin Hall (효신전, 孝愼殿) to announce the moved capital back to Gaegyeong.

In March, Bongsungdogam (봉숭도감) was installed and he then followed the Crown Prince's Ceremony (세자 책봉례). However, his father tried to enforce the Ceremony inconsistent with the etiquette, so Gim Ja-su (김자수), an ambassador from Seonggyungwan, took issue with it. Finally, the Ceremony was postponed to August. Then, on 15th, the King delivered the Crown Prince's seal to Wang Seok through Seol Jang-su (설장수), a priest from Chanseong Temple (찬성사) and a feast was held after the ceremony. Also, on 25th, they announced that Seok already became the Crown Prince.

Affairs with the Ming dynasty
Meanwhile, the Crown Prince was said to be distracted by the issue of joined and made alliance with the Ming dynasty. There were voices of concern that the Ming mightn't rebuke him. The Ming sent their first envoy in April after King Gongyang ascended the throne and demanded that 10,000 horses (1만필) be sold in Goryeo, but Goryeo could not meet the number and only sent 1,500 horses in June (1,500필만). At this time, Wang was reprimanded for not meeting the deadline after sent to the Ming Dynasty, but there was no way for him to respond. Meanwhile, merchants who traded sheep were participate in the envoy to Ipjo and the ambassadors, such as Heo-Eung (허응) filed an appeal in September, insisted that the merchants be excluded from the party.

From September until December, Wang, along with Seol Jang-su (설장수) and others, were left the Ming and went back to Goryeo. On 10 March 1392, while Yi Hyeon (이현, 李玄) already arrived in Goryeo and reports the Crown Prince's expected return date, Wang then returned safely on the 26th and got such as greeting the new year and receiving a golden robes (금직문기의복, 金織文綺衣服).

He was loved by the Ming's Emperor and he treated him to a western tea while honoured Wang as "Marquess" (후, 侯) and "Duke" (공, 公), those made the Emperor also held banquets and feasts five times for several days during the Civil War and was given away the 2 Jeong (2정, 錠) gold, 10 jeong (10정) silver, and 100 pieces of silks (견단 100필) for him.

While returned home in the following years, he was welcomed by the Goryeo official who came out in Sodae Gate (서대문), Gaegyeong. However, all of Ming's given on him, returned to the national treasury by him own and it was said that he stole some of it and secretly bought a gun and gave it to his lover. In April, Wang went back to Jeokgyeong-won (적경원, 積慶園) in Hyosin Hall and he then met Yi Seong-gye in Hwangju, but in the next day, he visited Yi again who was injured after falling off a horse while hunting.

Deposition from the throne and death
In July 1392, Yi Seong-gye eventually deposed King Gongyang and following this, Wang then became Deposed Crown Prince (폐세자, 廢世子) while they exiled to Wonju, but later moved to Goyang, Gyeonggi-do. On 4 March 1394, they were moved again to Samcheok-si and was killed in there. Yi, who was now the new King of the new Joseon dynasty, reported this news to the Ming and after received this news, the Ming finally understood that Wang didn't return safely to Goryeo and instead got killed.

Family
Father: King Gongyang of Goryeo
Grandfather: Wang Gyun, Prince Jeongwon
Grandmother: Princess Boknyeong
Mother: Consort Sun of the Gyoha No clan
Grandfather: No-Jin, Prince Changseong
Grandmother: Consort Myeongui
Younger sister: Princess Suknyeong; husband: Wang Jib.
Younger sister: Princess Jeongsin; husband: U Seong-beom.
Younger sister: Princess Gyeonghwa; husband: Gang Hoe-gye.
Wife: Crown Princess consort, of the Incheon Yi clan – No issue.

References

External links
Crown Prince Jeongseong on Encykorea .

Korean princes
Year of birth unknown
1394 deaths
Date of birth unknown
14th-century Korean people
Heirs apparent who never acceded